Laurie Weeks (born 5 April 1986, Sydney, Australia) is a former professional and national representative rugby union footballer. He played at tighthead prop for the Melbourne Rebels. On 17 March 2017, in a game against the Chiefs, Weeks became the Rebels most capped player.

Super Rugby
Weeks made his Super Rugby debut for the Reds in February 2009 against the Bulls. The Rugby Union Players Association (RUPA) named Weeks 'Newcomer of the Year' for the 2009 season; Weeks played 23 games for the Reds 2009-2010. In 2011, Weeks left Queensland and moved to Victoria to join the Melbourne Rebels.

In 2012, his Rebel teammates included props Nic Henderson, Rodney Blake, 20-year-old Paul Alo-Emile, and new signings Kurtley Beale (fullback) and James O'Connor (inside centre).

Laurie weeks now works as the ticketing and marketing manager at the Melbourne Rebels and has ensured the existence of the Super Rugby franchise for at least another 2 years.

Super Rugby statistics

References

External links
 Melbourne Rebels profile of Laurie Weeks

1986 births
Australian rugby union players
Australia international rugby union players
Queensland Reds players
Rugby union props
Living people
Melbourne Rebels players
People educated at St Joseph's College, Hunters Hill
Rugby union players from Sydney
Sydney Stars players
Melbourne Rising players